Slant is the predominant angle of the downward stroke in handwriting based on Latin script. The slant of a sample of writing is a feature of many regional handwriting variations, and also a reflection of the copybook that is taught.

Examples

 Slant is measured in degrees counterclockwise from the base line;
 A slant of less than 90 degrees is a right-hand slant;
 A slant of more than 90 degrees is a left-hand slant. (No examples in the above table.)

Measurement of slants
A good basis for its estimation is the point of the handwritten curve where the velocity has its peak value in the downward stroke. The polar distribution of the running angle along a handwritten trajectory is another good method for estimating the slant angle. Left-handed writing is often accompanied by a slant value which is larger than 90 degrees, i.e., it is bent backward, to the left.

Graphology 
In Graphology slant can refer to either upstroke or downstroke values. These strokes can be made in the upper, middle, lower, or any combination of those zones.

Handwriting recognition 
In handwriting recognition, an affine transformation can be used to normalize handwritten input towards a population average or towards 90 degrees.

See also
Graphonomics
Shear mapping

Penmanship
Graphology